William Wilson (21 July 1905 – 1972) was a Scottish stained glass artist, printmaker and watercolour painter. He was a member of the Royal Scottish Academy. He was appointed an OBE.

Biography

Wilson learned stained glass making in an apprenticeship with James Ballantyne, and by studying under Herbert Hendrie. In 1932 he was awarded a Carnegie Travelling Scholarship by the Royal Scottish Academy, which he used to study at Edinburgh College of Art under Adam Bruce Thomson and to travel in France, Germany, Italy and Spain. In these travels he made pen and ink drawings of the Italian city of Venice, and the Spanish cities of Madrid, Granada, Ronda, and Toledo. He studied printmaking under Adam Bruce Thomson. In watercolour he belonged to the Edinburgh School. He studied further at the Royal College of Art, London, producing etchings and engravings of subjects such as 'Loch Scavaig, Skye' in the 1930s. Some of his works have been on display at The Scottish Gallery, Edinburgh. He also competed in the art competitions at the 1948 Summer Olympics.

Wilson taught stained glass making at Edinburgh College of Art. He started his own studio in 1937, making stained glass windows for Canterbury Cathedral and a number of Scottish Churches. He slowly became blind through diabetes. As well as religious stained glass, he made secular pieces such as "The Irish Jig" which was originally fitted in his Edinburgh home.

Works

Wilson made the 'exceptional' windows at the Morningside North parish church, Edinburgh, now a community building. An excellent detailed account of the windows he made for Greenbank Parish Church, Edinburgh is available. In 1951 he completed the East window of St Andrew's church in Stamford Hill, as a replacement for the original which had been blown by a V1 during the blitz.

He made the East window for Ardwell church, and in 1953, the East windows for St Machar's Cathedral, Aberdeen which depict the Nativity, the Last Supper, the Crucifixion and Christ surrounded by the Scottish saints, and a window for Dunino church, Fife. He made 16 windows between 1952 and 1961 for Brechin Cathedral, Angus, Scotland. He is responsible for four windows in the chapel of the University of St Andrews, though given his increasing blindness the final two may have been partly the work of his assistants.

St Teresa's Dumfries.  He made windows in 1958 in the newly completed St Teresa's Church, Dumfries, the window in the Baptistry showing Our Lord being baptised by St John the Baptist and the window outside the Baptistry depicting St Joseph as a carpenter at his workbench with the boy Jesus.

Wilson's largest surviving set of windows is at Craigiebuckler church, Aberdeen. The windows form a single scheme covering the Old Testament and the New Testament of the Bible. One of his last windows is his 1965 stained glass image of St Columba in the Abbey Church, Iona.

Permanent collections

Some of Wilson's works are in the collection of the National Galleries of Scotland. His "Scottish Fishermen" is in Aberdeen Art Gallery.

Honours and awards

Wilson was a member of the Royal Scottish Academy (RSA). He was appointed an OBE.

Reception

The University of St Andrews describes Wilson as "one of Scotland's great artists, a master of the arts of printmaking, painting and stained glass". Bourne Fine Art note that "in all he did, his style was very distinctive".

References

External links
  'William Wilson: Print | Paint | Glass: 8 October - 13 November 2022', Royal Scottish Academy

Further reading

 Guichard, Kenneth (1977). British Etchers 1850-1940, Robin Garton, London.
 Moody, Rona H.(2006). Images of broken light: William Wilson (1905 - 1972), The Journal of Stained Glass Vol XXX pp 140 – 150, London,

External links
 William Wilson's scrap box
 William Wilson at the Scottish Gallery

1905 births
1972 deaths
Scottish stained glass artists and manufacturers
20th-century Scottish painters
Scottish male painters
Scottish printmakers
Alumni of the Edinburgh College of Art
Officers of the Order of the British Empire
20th-century British printmakers
Olympic competitors in art competitions
20th-century Scottish male artists